The 2021 European Ladies' Team Championship took place 6–10 July at Royal County Down Golf Club, in Newcastle, County Down, Northern Ireland, United Kingdom It was the 38th women's golf amateur European Ladies' Team Championship.

Venue 

The hosting course, one of the oldest on the island of Ireland, originally designed by Old Tom Morris and located in naturally links settings in the Murlough Nature Reserve, stretching along the shores of Dundrum Bay, was established in 1889.

The course had previously hosted several editions of the Irish Open, the Senior British Open Championship, The Amateur Championship and the British Ladies Amateur Golf Championship and the 1968 Curtis Cup and the 2007 Walker Cup.

The championship course was set up with par 73 over 7,011 yards.

Format 
All participating teams played two qualification rounds of stroke-play with six players, counted the five best scores for each team.

The eight best teams formed flight A, in knock-out match-play over the next three days. The teams were seeded based on their positions after the stroke-play. The first placed team was drawn to play the quarter final against the eight placed team, the second against the seventh, the third against the sixth and the fourth against the fifth. In each match between two nation teams, two 18-hole foursome games and five 18-hole single games were played. Teams were allowed to switch players during the team matches, selecting other players in to the afternoon single games after the morning foursome games. Teams knocked out after the quarter finals played one foursome game and four single games in each of their remaining matches. Games all square after 18 holes were declared halved, if the team match was already decided.

The eight teams placed 9–16 in the qualification stroke-play formed flight B, to play similar knock-out match-play, with one foursome game and four single games, to decide their final positions.

The three teams placed 17–19 in the qualification stroke-play formed flight C, to meet each other, with one foursome game and four single games, to decide their final positions.

Teams 
19 nation teams contested the event. Each team consisted of six players.

Players in the leading teams

Other participating teams

Winners 
Team Scotland, who never had won the championship, lead  the opening 36-hole qualifying competition, with an 8 over par score of  738, ten strokes ahead of home team Ireland, combined from Northern Ireland and the Republic of Ireland. Defending champions Sweden, searching their fourth win in a row, and the Czech Republic, was another stroke back.

Individual leader in the 36-hole stroke-play competition was Hannah Darling, Scotland, with a score of 9 under par 137, three strokes ahead of Jana Melichova, Czech Republic.

Team England won the championship, beating defending champions Sweden 5–2 in the final and earned their eleventh title. With the win, England became the nation with most win in the history of the championship, one more than Sweden.

Team Italy earned third place, beating Scotland 5–1  in the bronze match.

Results 
Qualification round

Team standings

* Note: In the event of a tie the order was determined by the better total non-counting scores.

Individual leaders

 Note: There was no official award for the lowest individual score.

Flight A

Bracket

Final games

* Note: Game declared halved, since team match already decided.

Flight B

Bracket

Flight C

Team matches

Team standings

* Note: In the event of a tie the order was first determined by the better total number of won games and second by the better total won holes advantage.

Final standings

Sources:

See also 
 Espirito Santo Trophy – biennial world amateur team golf championship for women organized by the International Golf Federation.
 European Amateur Team Championship – European amateur team golf championship for men organised by the European Golf Association.
 European Ladies Amateur Championship – European amateur individual golf championship for women organised by the European Golf Association.

References

External links 
 European Golf Association: Results

European Ladies' Team Championship
Golf tournaments in Ireland
European Ladies' Team Championship
European Ladies' Team Championship
European Ladies' Team Championship